The Krays is a 1990 British biographical crime drama film directed by Peter Medak. The film is based on the lives and crimes of the British gangster twins Ronald and Reginald Kray, often referred to as The Krays. The film stars Billie Whitelaw, Tom Bell, and real life brothers Gary and Martin Kemp, both of whom were members of the band Spandau Ballet.

Plot

The film charts the lives of the Kray twins from childhood to adult life. The plot focuses on the relationship between the twins and their doting mother (Whitelaw). Ronald (Gary Kemp) is the dominant one, influencing his brother Reginald (Martin Kemp) to perform several acts of violence as they rise to power as the leaders of a powerful organised gang in 1960s London.
The movie focuses more on the personal life of the brothers, including Reg's marriage and then alienation from his wife, culminating in her suicide. The movie omits the police investigation going against the Krays and ends with a jump-cut to them attending their mother's funeral in 1982, already serving time in prison by then.

Cast

Reception
The Krays holds a rating of 82% on Rotten Tomatoes based on 17 reviews.

Box office
The film opened at the top of the UK box office with a gross of £1,036,117 for the week. It remained at number one for a second week and went on to gross £3,707,649 ($7 million) at the UK box office. In the United States and Canada, it grossed $2,060,847.

Awards
Nominee Best Supporting Actress – BAFTA (Billie Whitelaw)
Winner Best Film – Evening Standard British Film Awards (Peter Medak)
Winner Most Promising Newcomer – Evening Standard British Film Awards (Philip Ridley)
Winner Best Actress – International Fantasy Film Awards (Fantasporto) (Billie Whitelaw)
Nominee Best Film – International Fantasy Film Awards (Fantasporto) (Peter Medak)
Winner George Delerue Prize for Music – Ghent International Film Festival (Michael Kamen)

See also
 Legend, a 2015 film about the Krays with Tom Hardy playing both brothers

References

External links

1990 films
1990s biographical drama films
1990 crime drama films
1990s gang films
British biographical drama films
British crime drama films
British gangster films
Crime films based on actual events
Drama films based on actual events
1980s English-language films
Hood films
Films scored by Michael Kamen
Films about dysfunctional families
Films about murderers
Films about twin brothers
Films directed by Peter Medak
Films set in the 1930s
Films set in the 1940s
Films set in 1951
Films set in the 1960s
Films set in 1982
Films set in London
Georges Delerue Award winners
Works about the Kray twins
Films about organised crime in the United Kingdom
1990s English-language films
1990s American films
1990s British films